The 1945 Dwars door België was the inaugural edition of the Dwars door Vlaanderen cycle race and was held on 30 and 31 August 1945. The first section of the race began in Brussels and ended in Sint-Truiden; while the second section began in Sint-Truiden and ended in Waregem. The race was won by Rik Van Steenbergen.

General classification

References

1945
1945 in road cycling
1945 in Belgian sport